Maddika Subba Reddy is an Indian cell biologist and the head of the  Laboratory of Cell Death and Cell Survival (LCDCS) of the Centre for DNA Fingerprinting and Diagnostics. A Wellcome-DBT Senior Fellow, Singh is known for his studies cell signaling and phosphatases. The Department of Biotechnology of the Government of India awarded him the National Bioscience Award for Career Development, one of the highest Indian science awards, for his contributions to biosciences, in 2017/18.

Biography 

Maddika Subba Reddy secured his PhD in Biochemistry and Medical Genetics from the University of Manitoba in 2007. His post-doctoral training was at the laboratory of Junjie Chen of Yale University and on his return to India in 2009, he joined the Centre for DNA Fingerprinting and Diagnostics (CDFD) where he heads the  Laboratory of Cell Death and Cell Survival (LCDCS). A Wellcome Trust-DBT India Alliance senior fellow since 2016, Reddy is known for his studies on cellular phosphatases and cellular signaling pathways.

The team led by Reddy is credited with the identification of NEDD4-like E3 ubiquitin-protein ligase WWP2, an E3 ligase, as a regulator for PTEN, a tumor suppressor gene and the discovery is reported to have significance in controlling cell proliferation, thereby in controlling cancer. He has published a number of articles; ResearchGate, an online repository of scientific articles has listed 77 of them.

Awards and honors 
The Department of Biotechnology of the Government of India awarded him the National Bioscience Award for Career Development, one of the highest Indian science awards, for his contributions to biosciences, in 2017/18. An elected member of the Guha Research Conference and a former young associate of the Indian Academy of Sciences, he is also a recipient of the NASI-Scopus Young Scientist Award of the Elsevier and National Academy of Sciences, India for the year 2017.

Selected bibliography

See also 

 Kinetochore
 PTEN (gene)

Notes

References

Further reading

External links 
 

Indian scientific authors
Year of birth missing (living people)
N-BIOS Prize recipients
Indian cell biologists
Yale University alumni
University of Manitoba alumni
Living people